Strashimirovo (Bulgarian: Страшимирово) is a village in north-eastern Bulgaria. It is located in the municipality of Beloslav, Varna Province.

As of September 2015 the village has a population of 946.

References

Villages in Varna Province